Hermagoras may refer to:

Hermagoras of Amphipolis (3rd century BC), stoic philosopher
Hermagoras of Temnos (1st century BC), rhetorician 
Hermagoras of Aquileia (3rd century AD), first bishop of Aquileia and saint